North Cooking Lake is a hamlet in Alberta, Canada within Strathcona County.

Due to the multiple lakes nearby with sandy beaches, North Cooking Lake was known as one of Edmonton's recreation and resort spots in the early 1900s (decade). It was so popular that special trains operated to bring vacationers to the North Cooking Lake Station where steamers and motor boats delivered them to different resorts. Once a teeming playground, North Cooking Lake is now a peaceful residential retreat.

Demographics 
The population of North Cooking Lake according to the 2022 municipal census conducted by Strathcona County is 48, a decrease from its 2018 municipal census population count of 57.

See also 
List of communities in Alberta
List of hamlets in Alberta

References 

Designated places in Alberta
Hamlets in Alberta
Strathcona County